WIKA Alexander Wiegand SE & Co. KG is a  German company which manufactures pressure and temperature measuring equipment.

In 2017 the company employed about 10,000 people at its 43 subsidiaries and production sites worldwide. Its turnover was about 890 million euros. In 2021 the company stated about 11,000 employees and a turnover of about one billion euros. The company was established in 1946 in the town Klingenberg am Main, located in the district of Lower Franconia in Bavaria. It is headquartered and has its main industrial establishment there since then.

History
The name of the company "WIKA" was combined from the initial letters of the names of its founders Alexander Wiegand and Philipp Kachel. In 1956 Kachel left the company and founded his own business to produce thermometers. WIKA is still owned and chaired by a descendant of Alexander Wiegand. His son Konrad Wiegand took over in 1951. After the death of Konrad Wiegand in 1967 Ursula Wiegand, his widow, became chief of the company. Her son, who bears the same name as his grandfather, followed in 1996. 

The production in 1946 began with mechanical pressure and temperature gauges, which ran without electricity. In 1970 WIKA achieved the leading position in Europe. The company held its position as one of the world market leaders also after the classical manometry was more and more replaced by electronic pressure and temperature measuring and display devices. In 2010 WIKA produced more than 43 Million units. In 1986 the company was reunited with the Kachel-thermometer-factory.

Products
The company manufactures around 800 pressure and temperature measurement products in thousands of variants. The measuring ranges extend between vacuum and 15,000 bar. Wika products can measure and display temperatures in the spectrum between minus 250 and plus 1800 degrees Celsius.

Weblinks 
 WIKA worldwide

References 

Companies of Germany
Companies based in Bavaria
German companies established in 1946